Isaac Lewis House or Isaac Lewis Cottage may mean:
Isaac C. Lewis Cottage, listed on the National Register of Historic Places (NRHP) in Branford, Connecticut
Isaac Lewis House (Stratford, Connecticut), NRHP in Stratford, Connecticut